Charleston is a neighborhood, or section, of New York City's borough of Staten Island.  It is located on the island's South Shore, with Tottenville to the south, Pleasant Plains to the East, Rossville to the north, and the Arthur Kill to the west. The neighborhood is represented in the New York City Council by Joe Borelli and in the New York State Senate by Andrew Lanza.

History 
Charleston, once a small village settled by the Androvette family in 1699, bore their name as Androvetteville or Androvettetown through the 18th century.  The Androvettes engaged in farming and in approximately 1850, eight of the twenty-nine structures in the village belonged to the Androvette family.

Many locals may still remember Charleston as Kreischerville. With the arrival of Balthasar Kreischer (1813–1886), a Bavarian immigrant and founder of the Kreischer Brick Manufactory, the area became known as Kreischerville as his business success imparted growth to the surrounding area.  Balthasar Kreischer had three mansions built on Kreischer Hill, one of which stands to this day and is designated a historical landmark.  The remaining Kreischer House at 4500 Arthur Kill Road at the intersection of Kreischer Street, was renovated by the Staten Island Land Development LLC.  The mansion has a certificate of occupancy for a 70-seat restaurant that will operate at night.  The factory, built in 1854, was destroyed by fire in 1877 and rebuilt.  The factory finally shut its doors in 1927.

The name Charleston seems to have arisen during World War I, when anti-German sentiment flourished as the United States entered the war.  "Charleston" appears to have been chosen so as to name the village after Charles Kreischer, one of Balthasar Kreischer's sons.

Charleston once had its own United States Post Office branch, and mail sent there bore the postal code "Staten Island 13, New York".  The post office, located at 28 Androvette Street, was closed in 1949.  While neighborhoods on Staten Island do not have universally agreed-upon boundaries, most observers today reckon Charleston as consisting of a triangle-shaped territory enclosed by Bloomingdale Road, the Richmond Parkway, and the Arthur Kill; this gives Charleston a slightly larger area than that which the former post office served—and by the current prevailing definition Charleston includes Sandy Ground, settled in 1833 by African Americans who had achieved freedom from slavery, most of whom came to the area from Maryland; remnants of the original settlement still exist.

Development 
Recent development in the area has spawned a new shopping corridor along Veterans Road West, including Staten Island's first Target and third Home Depot, among many other stores located in Bricktown Centre at Charleston, an open-air lifestyle center. A second shopping center is located along Veterans Road West. Development in that part of Charleston has continued.

The Tides at Charleston, an adult community development of approximately 120 units broke ground in Summer 2007, with units available for occupancy as of early 2008. A Kresicherville Active Adult community is slated to cost $25 million and will preserve the Kreischer mansion as a central landmark for the development.

Charleston is one of the most remote and sparsely populated areas within all of New York City. In addition to the Kreischer mansion and Sandy Ground, the neighborhood is also home to the Clay Pit Ponds State Park Preserve, and the Arthur Kill Correctional Facility, a closed state prison property. Even today many Charleston residents still keep horses on their property.

In June 2016, a  Shoprite opened on Veterans Road. It is the only supermarket located in Charleston as of 2020.

In September 2017, developers announced the construction of Riverside Galleria, a  shopping mall in the southern part of Charleston being designed by Studio V Architecture. The mall would include amenities such as a waterfront park, elevated walkways, and green roofs, as well as a variety of shops that included restaurants, a "dine-in cinema", and a supermarket. However, plans for the mall were canceled in January 2019 due to community opposition.

On March 17, 2022, the NYPL opened its first net-zero energy library in New York City, located in the Bricktown Commons shopping center on the South Shore. Designed by Ikon 5 Architects, nearly 100 percent of the building's energy will be derived from solar panels. The Charleston Library features "dedicated spaces for adults, teens, and children and flexible multi-purpose rooms for programs and classes."

Transportation
MTA Regional Bus Operations' Charleston Depot, off Arthur Kill Road, opened in January 2011. Charleston is served by the  local buses along Arthur Kill Road, all of which terminate at Bricktown Mall. Charleston is also served by the  local bus on Bloomingdale Road. The SIM26, an express bus to Manhattan, also runs along Bloomingdale Road. New York State Route 440 and Korean War Veterans Parkway pass through Charleston.

Cityscape
In 2002, Allen Alishahi, a broker at Sun Properties of New York Inc., estimates that one third of Charleston was residential, one third had commercial and industrial properties, and one third was parkland.

As of 2002, the majority of houses in Charleston are single-family houses. The varieties of houses in Charleston include ranch houses, raised ranch houses, Victorian houses, detached Colonial houses, and French mansard houses. A significant number of houses in Charleston are around 70 to 80 years old and have prices ranging from $179,900 to $580,000, with the former representing the costs of a ranch house. Houses built within several years until 2002 tend to be semidetached houses within a $200,000 to $300,000 price range grouped in enclaves, or large custom detached houses with prices at or above $500,000. As of that year, some houses in the area are over 100 years old.

Demographics
As of 2002, many groups of people live in Charleston, including many families of Irish and Italian origin. Many residents of 19th century Charleston were Germans. In the 20th century many Hungarian immigrants settled in Charleston.

Crime 

Despite having a very low crime rate along with the rest of the South Shore, Charleston was nonetheless home to two crime-related figures, one a perpetrator and the other a victim, as "thrill killer" Richard Biegenwald (who committed a 1958 murder and was subsequently  convicted of another killing that took place in Asbury Park, New Jersey in 1983) was born and raised there; and in 1990, the neighborhood attracted more media attention when an anti-gay hate crime was committed there: James Zappalorti, a 45-year-old disabled veteran of the Vietnam War, was stabbed to death by two assailants, one of whom also resided in Charleston at the time.  The Zappalorti murder sparked successful renewed calls for New York State to adopt enhanced penalties for crimes motivated by bias.

Education
The New York City Department of Education serves Charleston. As of 2002 the majority of Charleston elementary age students attend P.S. 56. Some elementary school students attend P.S 6 or P.S. 62. For grades 6 though 8, I.S. 34, Totten Intermediate School and Paulo Intermediate School, I.S. 75 serve the majority of middle school age students in Charleston. Tottenville High School is the area high school.

The sole school facility within Charleston is Annex D, an annex to P.S. 25 South Richmond High School, a special education school with its main campus in Pleasant Plains; the annex was previously P.S. 4, a standalone school.

References

Neighborhoods in Staten Island